Kendal Parish Church, also known as the Holy Trinity Church due to its dedication to the Holy Trinity, is the Anglican parish church of  Kendal, Cumbria, England.  It is recorded in the National Heritage List for England as a designated Grade I listed building.

Visitors to the church are struck by its size and the lightness of the interior. This lightness is due to the unusual construction of five aisles, separated by columns and allowing generous window area.
 
The nave is 800 years old and the other aisles have been added over the centuries so that, in its heyday, a congregation of 1100 was regularly accommodated.

Anglo-Saxon church 

A church was built on the site during the Anglo-Saxon period using material "robbed out" from the ruined Roman fort at Watercrook to the south of the town. A record in the Domesday Book, and the shaft of an Anglian cross, housed in the Parr Chapel, are dated at approximately AD 850.

Norman period 

Westmorland was only subdued by the Normans in 1092 and Ivo Taillebois (Anglicized, the name is translated to John Talbot) became the first Norman Baron of Kentdale, he gave the church and its lands to St Mary's Abbey in York. In 1189, the inhabitants of Kendal were massacred in church by Duncan, Earl of Fife. In 1201, the present building was constructed; the arch over the piscina was found carved with this date during Victorian restoration (1829).

Parr Chapel
The Parr Chapel was built by the Parr family in the fourteenth century, and the family coats of arms are to be seen on the ceiling. The maidenheads also featured on the walls had long been associated with the Parr family badge/arms. The device of a maidens head couped below the breast vested in ermine and gold; her hair of the last, or; and her head encircled with a wreath of red and white roses was taken from the Ros of Kendal family (ancestors of the Parrs). The large tomb in this chapel is that of William Parr, 1st Baron Parr of Kendal, grandfather of Catherine Parr, the last queen consort of King Henry VIII.

Organs
The church contains two organs: 
 at the West end, the main organ by J.W. Walker 1969 (45/3M+P) incorporating an earlier instrument by Willis 
 at the East end, the choir organ by Bevington c.1885 (11/2M+P) was bought in 2002

See also

Grade I listed churches in Cumbria
Listed buildings in Kendal

References

External links

Kendal, Holy Trinity parish records at Cumbria Archive Centre, Kendal

Church of England church buildings in Cumbria
Diocese of Carlisle
Grade I listed churches in Cumbria
Grade I listed buildings in Kendal